The Iapygians or Apulians (Ĭāpyges; , Umbrian Iabuscer) were an Indo-European-speaking people, dwelling in an eponymous region of the southeastern Italian Peninsula named Iapygia (modern Apulia) between the beginning of the first millennium BC and the first century BC. They were divided into three tribal groups: the Daunians, Peucetians and Messapians. After their lands were gradually colonized by the Romans from the late 4th century onward and eventually annexed to the Roman Republic by the early 1st century BC, Iapygians were fully Latinized and assimilated into Roman culture.

Name 
The region was known to the Greeks of the 5th century BC as Iapygía (Ἰαπυγία), and its inhabitants as the Iápyges (Ἰάπυγες). It was probably the term used by the indigenous peoples to designate themselves. The name Iapyges has also been compared to that of the Iapydes, an Illyrian tribe of northern Dalmatia.

Some ancient sources treat Iapygians and Messapians as synonymous, and several writers of the Roman period referred to them as Apuli in the north, Poediculi in the centre, and Sallentini or Calabri in the south. Those discrepancies in the exonyms may indicate that the sub-ethnic Iapygian structures were unstable and sometimes fragmented. By the middle of the third century, Iapygians were generally divided by contemporary observers among three peoples: the Daunians in the north, the Peucetians in the centre, and the Messapians in the south.

Geography 

Iapygia (modern-day Apulia) was located in the southeastern part of the Italian Peninsula, between the Apennine Mountains and the Adriatic Sea.

The northeast area of the region, dominated by the massif of Monte Gargano (1,055 m), was largely unsuited for agriculture and abandoned to forests. To the south and west of the Gargano stretched the largest plain of peninsular Italy, the Tavoliere delle Puglie. Although it mainly consists of sands and gravels, the plain is also crossed by several rivers. In ancient times, the land was best suited for cereal cultivation and, above all, for the pasturage of sheep in the winter. The Ofanto river, one of the longest rivers of the Italian Peninsula, marked the southern border of the plain. Despite their name, the impervious Daunian Mountains (1,152 m), west of the plain, were strongly held by the Hirpini, an Oscan-speaking Samnite tribe.

Central Iapygia was composed of the Murge Plateau (686 m), an area poor in rivers. The western half of the massif was suitable only for grazing sheep; nearer the sea, the land was more adapted to cultivation, and likely used in ancient times to produce grains.

In the Salento peninsula, the landscape was more varied, though still without river formation. Olives are known to have been cultivated in this area during the pre-Roman period, but the scale of the production is uncertain. Several Greek colonies were located on the coast of the Gulf of Taranto, nearby the indigenous Messapians in southern Iapygia, most notably Taras, founded in the late 8th century BC, and Metapontion, founded in the late 7th century.

Culture

Language 

The Iapygians were a "relatively homogeneous linguistic community" speaking a non-Italic, Indo-European language, commonly called 'Messapic'. The language, written in variants of the Greek alphabet, is attested from the mid-6th to the late-2nd century BC. Some scholars have argued that the term 'Iapygian languages' should be preferred to refer to those dialects, and the term 'Messapic' reserved to the inscriptions found in the Salento peninsula, where the specific Messapian people dwelt in the pre-Roman era. The closest language to Messapic is Albanian, with which it forms a common branch titled Illyric in Hyllested & Joseph (2022). Hyllested & Joseph (2022) in agreement with recent bibliography identify Greco-Phrygian as the IE branch closest to the Albanian-Messapic one. These two branches form an areal grouping - which is often called "Balkan IE" - with Armenian.

During the 6th century BC, Messapia, and more marginally Peucetia, underwent Hellenizing cultural influences, mainly from the nearby Taras. The use of writing systems was introduced in this period, with the acquisition of the Laconian-Tarantine alphabet and its adaptation to the Messapic language. The second great Hellenizing wave occurred during the 4th century BC, this time also involving Daunia and marking the beginning of Peucetian and Daunian epigraphic records, in a local variant of the Hellenistic alphabet that replaced the older Messapic script.

Since its settlement, Messapic was in contact with the Italic languages of the region. In the centuries before Roman annexation, the frontier between Messapic and Oscan ran through Frentania-Irpinia-Lucania-Apulia. An "Oscanization" and "Samnitization" process gradually took place which is attested in contemporary sources via the attestation of dual identities for settlements. In these regions an Oscan/Lucanian population and a large Daunian element intermixed in different ways. Larinum, a settlement which has produced a large body of Oscan onomastics is described as a "Daunian city" and Horace who was from Venusia in the transboundary area between the Daunians and the Lucanians described himself as  "Lucanian or Apulian". The creation of Roman colonies in southern Italy after the early 4th century BCE had a great impact in the Latinization of the area.

By the 4th century BC, inscriptions from central Iapygia suggest that the local artisan class had acquired some proficiency in the Greek language, while the whole regional elite was used to learning Latin by the 3rd century BC. The Oscan language became also widespread after Italic peoples had occupied the territory in that period. Along with the Messapic dialects, Greek, Oscan and Latin were consequently spoken and written all together in the whole region of Iapygia during the Romanization period, and bilingualism in Greek and Messapic was probably common in the Salento peninsula.

Religion 

The late pre-Roman religion of the Iapygians appears as a substrate of indigenous beliefs mixed with Greek elements. The Roman conquest probably accelerated the hellenisation of a region already influenced by contacts with Magna Grecia from the 8th century BC onward. Aphrodite and Athena were thus worshipped in Iapygia as Aprodita and Athana, respectively. Some deities of native origin have also been highlighted by scholars, such as Zis ('sky-god'), Menzanas ('lord of horses'), Venas ('desire'), Taotor ('the people, community'), and perhaps Damatura ('mother-earth').

Pre-Roman religious cults have also left few material traces. Preserved evidence indicates that indigenous Iapygian beliefs featured the sacrifices of living horses to the god Menzanas, the fulfilling of oracles for anyone who slept wrapped in the skin of a sacrificed ewe, and the curative powers of the waters at the herõon of the god Podalirius, preserved in Greek tales. Several cave sanctuaries have been identified on the coast, most notably the Grotta Porcinara sanctuary (Santa Maria di Leuca), in which both Messapian and Greek marines used to write their vows on the walls.

It is likely that Peucetians had no civic cult requiring public buildings, and if urban sanctuaries have been identified in Daunia (at Teanum Apulum, Lavello, or Canosa), no conspicuous buildings are found before the Romanization period.

Dress 
The Iapygian peoples were noted for their ornamental dress. By the 7th century BC, the Daunian aristocracy were wearing highly ornate costumes and much jewellery, a custom that persisted into the classical period, with depictions of Iapygians with long hair, wearing highly patterned short tunics with elaborate fringes. Young women were portrayed with long tunics belted at the waist, generally with a headband or diadem. On ritual or ceremonial occasions, the women of central Iapygia wore a distinctive form of mantle over their heads that left the headband visible above the brow.

Burial 
Iapygian funeral traditions were distinct from those of neighbouring Italic peoples: whereas the latter banished adult burials to the fringes of their settlements, the inhabitants of Iapygia buried their dead both outside and inside their own settlements. Although females might occasionally be buried with weapons, arms, and armour, such grave-goods were normally reserved for male funerals.

Until the end of the 4th century BC, the normal practice among Daunians and Peucetians was to lay out the body in a fetal position with the legs drawn up towards the chest, perhaps symbolizing the rebirth of the soul in the womb of Mother Earth. Messapians, by contrast, laid out their dead in the extended position as did other Italic peoples. From the 3rd century BC, extended burials with the body lying on its back began to appear in Daunia and Peucetia, although the previous custom survived well into the 2nd century BC in some areas.

History

Origin 
The leading view among scholars, already mentioned by ancient sources and supported by archaeological evidence, is that Iapygians were probably southern Illyrians who migrated from the Western Balkans towards southeastern Italy in the early first millennium BCE.

Pre-Roman period 
The Iapygians most likely left the eastern coasts of the Adriatic for Italy from the 11th century BC onwards, merging with pre-existing Italic and Mycenean cultures and providing a decisive cultural and linguistic imprint. The three main Iapygian tribal groups–Daunians, Peucetians and Messapians–retained a remarkable cultural unity in the first phase of their development. After the 8th century BC, however, they began a phase marked by a process of differentiation due to internal and external causes.

Contacts between Messapians and Greeks intensified after the end of the 8th century BC and the foundation of the Spartan colony of Taras, preceded by earlier pre-colonial Mycenaean incursions during which the site of Taras seems to have already played an important role. Until the end of the 7th century, however, Iapygia was generally not encompassed in the area of influence of Greek colonial territories, and with the exception of Taras, the inhabitants were evidently able to avoid other Greek colonies in the region. During the 6th century BC Messapia, and more marginally Peucetia, underwent Hellenizing cultural influences, mainly from the nearby Taras.

The relationship between Messapians and Tarantines deteriorated over time, resulting in a series of clashes between the two peoples from the beginning of the 5th century BC. After two victories of the Tarentines, the Iapygians inflicted a decisive defeat on them, causing the fall of the aristocratic government and the implementation of a democratic one in Taras. It also froze relations between Greeks and the indigenous people for about half a century. Only in the late-5th and 6th centuries did they re-establish relationships. The second great Hellenizing wave occurred during the 4th century BC, this time also involving Daunia.

Roman conquest 
The Roman conquest of Iapygia started in the late 4th century, with the subjugation of the Canusini and the Teanenses. It paved the way for Roman hegemony in the entire peninsula, as they used their progression in the region to contain Samnite power and encircle their territory during the Samnite Wars. By the early third century, Rome had planted two strategic colonies, Luceria (314) and Venusia (291), on the border of Iapygia and Samnium.

Social organization 
In the early period, the Iapygian housing system was made up of small groups of huts scattered throughout the territory, different from the later Greco-Roman tradition of cities. The inhabitants of the rural districts gathered for common decisions, for feasts, for religious practices and rites, and to defend themselves against external attacks.

From the 6th century BC onward, the large but thinly occupied settlements that had been founded around the beginning of the first millennium BC began to take on a more structured form. The largest of them gradually gained the administrative capacity and the manpower to erect stone defensive walls and eventually to mint their own coins, indicating both urbanization and the assertion of political autonomy.

According to Thucydides, some of these Iapygian communities were ruled by powerful individuals in the late 5th century BC. A small number of them had grown into such large fortified settlements that they probably regarded themselves as autonomous city-states by the end of the 4th century, and some of the northern cities were seemingly in control of an extensive territory during that period. Arpi, who had the largest earthen ramparts of Iapygia in the Iron Age, and Canusium, whose territory probably straddled the Ofanto River from the coast up to Venusia, appear to have grown into regional hegemonic powers.

This regional hierarchy of urban power, in which a few dominant city-states competed with each other in order to assert their own hegemony over limited resources, most likely led to frequent internecine warfare between the various Iapygian groups, and to external conflicts between them and foreign communities.

Warfare 

As evidenced by items found in graves and warriors shown on red-figure vase paintings, Iapigyan fought with little other defensive armour than a shield, sometimes a leather helmet and a jerkin, exceptionally a breastplate. Their most frequent weapon was the thrusting spear, followed by the javelin, whereas swords were relatively rare. Bronze belts were also a common item found in warrior graves.

Scenes of combat depicted on red-figure vase paintings also demonstrate that the various Iapygian communities were frequently involved in conflict with each other, and that prisoners of war were taken for ransom or to be sold into slavery.

Economy 

Archaeological evidence suggests that transhumance was practised in pre-Roman Iapygia during the first millennium BC, and that wide areas of the region were reserved to provide pasture for transhumant sheep. Weaving was indeed an important activity in the 5th and 4th centuries BC. The textile made from wool was most likely marketed in the Greek colony of Taranto, and the winter destination of Iapygian pastoralists probably located in the Tavoliere plain, where the weaving industry was already well developed by the seventh or early sixth century BC, as evidenced by the depiction of weavers at work on a stelae.

See also 

List of ancient Illyrian peoples and tribes
List of ancient peoples of Italy

Notes

References

Bibliography 

Ancient peoples of Italy
Socii